Indian Queen (1985–2000) was a British thoroughbred racehorse.

Indian Queen or The Indian Queen may also refer to:

 The Indian Queen (opera), a largely unfinished semi-opera with music by Henry Purcell
 The Indian Queen (play), by Sir Robert Howard and John Dryden (1664)
Indian Queen Tavern and Black's Store, a historic hotel and store complex in Charlestown, Maryland, U.S.
 George Washington House (Bladensburg, Maryland), or Indian Queen Tavern
 "Indian Queen", track on Flashback (Electric Light Orchestra album) (2000)

See also
Indian Queens (disambiguation)